Ælfmær or Ælfmaer may refer to:

Ælfmær (Bishop of Sherborne) (died 1023), Anglo-Saxon bishop in Wessex
Ælfmær (Bishop of Selsey) (died ), Anglo-Saxon bishop in Sussex

Old English given names